George Shepheard (26 January 1770 – 7 September 1842) was an English professional cricketer who made one appearances in first-class cricket for Surrey.

References

External sources
 CricketArchive record

1770 births
1842 deaths
English cricketers
English cricketers of 1787 to 1825
Middlesex cricketers